Taoufik Belbouli (born December 10, 1954 in Tunisia) is a retired French Tunisian professional boxer. He briefly held the WBA cruiserweight title from 1989 until 1990, relinquishing the belt due to injury.

Professional career
Belbouli turned pro in 1982 and won the vacant WBA cruiserweight title with a TKO win over Michael Greer in March 1989 in Morocco. He vacated the title six months later, never defending it, but tried to regain it in November 1990 when he fought his successor as champion, Robert Daniels. He announced his retirement after the bout, which finished a draw.

Professional boxing record

See also
List of cruiserweight boxing champions

External links

1954 births
Living people
Tunisian male boxers
French male boxers
French sportspeople of Tunisian descent
Cruiserweight boxers
Heavyweight boxers
World cruiserweight boxing champions
World Boxing Association champions
Mediterranean Games bronze medalists for Tunisia
Competitors at the 1979 Mediterranean Games
Mediterranean Games medalists in boxing